Tanema-ji is a Shingon Buddhist Temple located in Kōchi, Kōchi, Japan. It is the 34th temple of the Shikoku Pilgrimage.

History 
According to the temple records, during the reign of Emperor Yomei (585-587), a Buddhist carpenter from Baekje who had come to build Shitenno-ji, was caught in a storm when leaving Japan, and drifted ashore to a port near the present day temple. As a part of a prayer for a safe voyage home, the carpenter carved an image of Bhaisajyaguru at the summit of the temple hill, which became the origin point of Tanema-ji. Years later during the Konin era (810-824), Kukai founded the temple using the Baekje carpenters carving as the Honzon, and spread the five grains he had brought from China across the temple grounds, deciding the present-day temple name Tanema-ji (種間寺 lit. “seed space temple”).

The temple was abandoned following the forced separation of Shinto and Buddhism, but was later restored in 1880.

References 

Shingon Buddhism
Buddhist temples in Japan
Kochi
Shikoku region